The "stupid motorist law" is a law in the U.S. state of Arizona that states that any motorist who becomes stranded after driving around barricades to enter a flooded stretch of roadway may be charged for the cost of their rescue. The law corresponds to section 28-910 of the Arizona Revised Statutes.

If public emergency services (such as a fire department or paramedics) are called to rescue a flooded motorist and tow the vehicle out of danger in Arizona, the cost of those services can be billed to the motorist, plus additional liability of up to $2,000. Motorists are only liable if water already covers the road, barriers are in place but bypassed, and people are rescued from a vehicle. The 'stupid-motorist law' is not a chargeable statute; to be fined under the law, a motorist must commit at least one other violation.

Although the statute was enacted in 1995, only a handful of incidents had been prosecuted under ARS 28-910 as of 2015.

Background
The need for the law came from the lack of storm sewers in the deserts of the Southwestern United States, combined with heavy rainfall in the desert, usually associated with the summer monsoon. These conditions can lead to flash floods in Arizona, which can unleash powerful torrents of water containing debris ranging in size from sand to boulders. Only  of water is required to reach the bottom of most passenger cars, which can cause loss of control and possible stalling.

Documented incidents
In late July 2013, a tour bus carrying 33 people was swept up while traveling down a flooded road. The bus was carried  before it was tipped on to its side. Occupants of the bus were able to escape to safety before rescue teams arrived. Because the area was under a flash flood warning at the time, the driver of the bus potentially faced charges under the stupid motorist law. This incident took place in northwestern Arizona in the small community of Dolan Springs.

Statute
The law reads exactly:

References 

Arizona statutes
Traffic law
1995 in American law